Turnings is a townland and historic site in County Kildare, Ireland, situated on the banks of the Morell River, a tributary of the River Liffey 25 km upstream from the Irish capital Dublin. It is  a rural area, and a planning application has been lodged with Kildare County Council (2007) to develop a town in the district.

Etymology
The origin of the placename is unclear. Some local fields around the house still bear Irish names: for instance, the rocky field facing the hall-door is called " Clocheraun; to the south are Parkanoss, " or " Parkanaughy," and " Cloonavoy,to the north is Gortshannick." Where the Turnings Road joins the Sallins Road is a stretch of it called " Crookaun," and a gate known as the - Gallows Gate."

Calendar Rolls and Historical Documents
In the Co Kildare (Clane) Inquisition., No. 5 of Charles II the townland goes by the name of Surning, " as well as " Turning and Twinings. In 1406 the custody of the lands in the town of " Surnyng " was granted by the king to Thomas Hall, who on 18 June 1422, was appointed Sheriff of the County Kildare."
In the 16th century it formed a part of the Manor of Whitechurch, which belonged to the Viscounts Gormanston. As early as 1508 William Preston, 2nd Viscount Gormanston, enfifed “Archdeacon Robert Sutton and Thomas Cornwalshe, Vicar of Stamullen, in the Manor of Whitechurch, alias Tullaghtipper, containing the towns and lands of le Turnyng, alias Surnyng, Clonyng, Killenmore, Kilbregagho, Killussy, Rathmore, near Clane, Collenblakeston, Ardress, Cloghle, Osbertiston, and Clanwhiche which were bold of the King.” Sir William died on the 22nd September, 1582, and was succeeded by his eldest son, Jenico Preston, 3rd Viscount, who leased the Manor of Whitechurch, on the 16th February, 1560, to Patrick Sarsfield, merchant, of Dublin,6 and brother of Sir William Sarsfield, Knight, of Lucan, County Dublin, to whom it passed, and in whose family it remained till it was forfeited by his grandson, William (son of John) Sarsfield, of Lucan, who joined in the Rebellion of 1641.
After being forfeited by the last-named William Sarsfield, Turnings was granted to Sir Theophilus Jones, Knt., of Osbertstown, in the County Meath. He was the second SOD of Doctor Lewis Jones, Bishop of Killaloo; he died on 2 January 1684, and was buried in Naas. By his wife, Alicia, daughter of Arthur, son of Sir William Usher, Knight., he left an eldest son, Sir Arthur Jones, Knight., who succeeded him in Osberstown .
About the year 1582 is recorded a pardon for rebellion of Edmond Keogh (the swarthy) O'Lalor, of Turnings, gentleman; Margaret, his wife; Richard, his son; Elis, his daughter; and Murrough O'Duffy, his servant.' The Mills family took possession of the house in the 19th century.

Turnings Architectural Fragment
A sculptured window-head of two lights can be found at the back of Turnings House. According to Walter Fitzgerald, who wrote about the carving in 1901, "it is not known whether this window is in situ, or whether it was brought here from another locality, is not known, its probable date is the fifteenth or sixteenth century."

Abattoir
In 1959 Turnings became the location for Ireland’s first horse abattoir, closed in the 1980s. The abattoir was re-opened in late 2009.

Bibliography
Corry, Eoghan and Tancred, Jim: Annals of Ardclough (Ardclough GAA 2004).
Journals of the Kildare Archaeological Society: Volume III : 340, 482-484.   Volume IV : 116.

References

External links
 Development Plan https://web.archive.org/web/20071120061344/http://kildare.ie/CountyCouncil/Planning/DevelopmentPlans/LocalAreaPlans/Straffan/... 
 Local area plan https://web.archive.org/web/20060927135741/http://kildare.ie/CountyCouncil/Planning/LocalAreaPlans/Straffan/index.html

Townlands of County Kildare